Zafar was an Iranian daily newspaper which was published in Tehran in the period 1944–1947. The paper was affiliated with the Tudeh Party like other publications such as Mardum and Razm and was the official organ of the party's workers' union, namely Tudeh Party Workers' Union.

History and profile
Zafar was first published in Tehran on 22 June 1944. The license of the paper belonged to Rıza Rusta, head of the Tudeh Party Workers' Union. The paper was a daily publication and an official media outlet of the Union. It featured articles about the activities of the Tudeh Party, including those of the party founders.

Until 1947 the paper was banned several times and replaced by other publications. For instance, on 8 December 1946 Zafar and its sister publication Rahbar were shut down by the Iranian government due to their harsh criticisms over the policies towards the US. Under such conditions it was clandestinely distributed in the country. Zafar reappeared in January 1947 when its ban dated 8 December 1946 had been removed on 31 December 1946. The paper continued to be published in February 1947, but soon it was closed once more and was not restarted again.

References

1944 establishments in Iran
1947 disestablishments in Iran
Banned newspapers
Censorship in Iran
Defunct newspapers published in Iran
Newspapers published in Tehran
Publications established in 1944
Publications disestablished in 1947
Persian-language newspapers
Publications of the Tudeh Party of Iran